Pentila swynnertoni, the Swynnerton's buff, is a butterfly in the family Lycaenidae. It is found in Mozambique and Zimbabwe. The habitat consists of forests.

Adults have been recorded on wing in February.

The larvae feed on algae (cyanobacteria) growing on trees.

References

Butterflies described in 1961
Poritiinae